Nižná Rybnica is a small village and municipality in the Sobrance District in the Košice Region of east Slovakia.

History
In historical records the village was first mentioned in 1333.

Geography
The village lies at an altitude of 111 metres and covers an area of 8.999 km2.

Culture
The village has a public library.

External links
 
https://web.archive.org/web/20070513023228/http://www.statistics.sk/mosmis/eng/run.html
http://en.e-obce.sk/obec/niznarybnica/nizna-rybnica.html
https://web.archive.org/web/20150801215939/http://niznarybnica.sk/

Villages and municipalities in Sobrance District